Arjun Sasi is an Indian singer. He has experience as a songwriter, rapper, and singer.

Biography 

Arjun Sasi is originally from Cochin, in the state of Kerala. He completed his bachelor's degree in Engineering in Electronics and Communication at MKCE in Kannur. He began his music career with his debut album S5 and began writing music for various stage shows. After the initial success of his album S5, Arjun Sasi worked along Vineeth Srinivasan, Shaan Rahman and Jakes Bejoy for the 2007 album Malayalee. He wrote and sang the English-lyric song “Friends Are Forever”. He provided song vocals for various eminent music directors including Vidyasagar, Deepak Dev, and Alphonse. Sasi is also an actor, having starred in the lead role of the Malayalam film Out of Syllabus.

Discography 

He worked as an English lyricist, singer and rapper for the following songs.

For Malayalam Films

For Tamil Films

Works done Internationally as a singer/rapper/lyricist

References

External links 
 https://web.archive.org/web/20160304052949/http://hindi.filmychai.com/Arjun-Sasi/celebrity/view/6215/index.html

Year of birth missing (living people)
Living people
Indian male singers